Poor housing may refer to:
Affordable housing, subsidized housing for people with a low income
Condemned property, housing with restrictions placed by the local authority due to poor safety or public health
Slum, a highly populated urban residential area often associated with poverty